Jim Hughes (born 9 January 1960) was a Scottish footballer who played for Kilmarnock, East Stirlingshire, Falkirk, Queen of the South, Clydebank, and Dumbarton.

References

1960 births
Scottish footballers
Dumbarton F.C. players
Kilmarnock F.C. players
East Stirlingshire F.C. players
Falkirk F.C. players
Queen of the South F.C. players
Clydebank F.C. (1965) players
Scottish Football League players
Living people
Association football midfielders